The James Putnam Jr. House is a historic First Period house in Danvers, Massachusetts.  It is a -story wood-frame structure, five bays wide, with a gambrel roof pierced by two interior chimneys.  The house was built in stages, beginning in about 1715 as a typical First Period double pile house (two stories, two rooms wide and one deep).  To this another double pile structure was added to the front, creating an early Federal style central hall structure.  The house's most prominent resident was Colonel Timothy Pickering, who leased it from 1802 to 1804, when he was serving as United States Senator.

The house was added to the National Register of Historic Places in 1990.

See also
National Register of Historic Places listings in Essex County, Massachusetts
List of the oldest buildings in Massachusetts

References

Houses completed in 1715
Houses in Danvers, Massachusetts
Houses on the National Register of Historic Places in Essex County, Massachusetts
1715 establishments in Massachusetts